Ian Tarik Khan (born 12 May 1960) is an international racecar driver. He took part in the FIA GT and FIA GT3 Championships, as well as the British Touring Car Championship.

Racing career
In 1992 he won the BRDC British Saloon Car Championship. The year after he continued to the British Touring Car Championship in a Vauxhall Cavalier, his most notable performance coming in the season-ending TOCA Shootout at Donington Park where he led for several laps thanks to the reverse-grid format.  In 1994 he competed again, firstly in a Toyota Carina and then his old Vauxhall for Maxted Motorsport.  From 1996 Ian raced in the Ferrari F355 championship and various endurance races. With races in the Renault Clio V6 Trophy between 1999–2001, from 2002 he has competed in the FIA GT Championship and the Le Mans 24 Hour.

Racing record

Complete 24 Hours of Spa results

Complete British Touring Car Championship results
(key) (Races in bold indicate pole position) (Races in italics indicate fastest lap)

Complete Deutsche Tourenwagen Meisterschaft results
(key) (Races in bold indicate pole position) (Races in italics indicate fastest lap)

† Not classified in championship due to only entering in the non-championship event.

24 Hours of Le Mans results

Complete 24 Hours of Silverstone results

Complete Porsche Supercup results
(key) (Races in bold indicate pole position) (Races in italics indicate fastest lap)

† Not eligible for points due to being a guest driver.

External links

 FIA GT Championship
 
 British Racing Drivers' Club

English racing drivers
FIA GT Championship drivers
1960 births
Living people
British Formula Three Championship drivers
British Formula 3000 Championship drivers
British Touring Car Championship drivers
24 Hours of Le Mans drivers
European Le Mans Series drivers
Porsche Supercup drivers
World Sportscar Championship drivers
24 Hours of Spa drivers
Britcar 24-hour drivers
British GT Championship drivers